The Secret of the Sword, also known as He-Man and She-Ra: The Secret of the Sword, is a 1985 American animated superhero film produced by Filmation. Although released before the series She-Ra: Princess of Power began, the film was a compilation of the first five episodes with minor edits made.
The film was part of a trend of theatrically released animated films created by producers of TV shows and toys during the 1980s.

The Secret of the Sword was first shown on television, in its original episodic form, during the week of the premiere of the She-Ra series, from September 9, 1985 to September 13, 1985.  For series purposes, the film is known as the storyline The Sword of She-Ra.

Plot
On Eternia, the Sorceress of Castle Grayskull is woken one night by a mysterious magic sword that leads her to a glowing portal known as a 'Time Gate'. Recognizing the sword as the 'Sword of Protection', the Sorceress summons Prince Adam and Cringer to Castle Grayskull and sends them through the portal to find the person destined to possess the sword.

Arriving in the other dimensional world of Etheria, Adam and Cringer stop at an inn for lunch and discover that Etheria is ruled by an evil intergalactic army known as the Horde. When some Hordesmen soldiers cause trouble in the inn, Adam stands up to them and defeats them with the help of an archer named Bow, who tells Adam that he and his friend Kowl are members of the 'Great Rebellion'.

As word of the fight reaches the Horde's leader Hordak, Bow and Kowl take Adam and Cringer to the Rebellion's base in the Whispering Woods. They meet the other Rebels, including their leader Princess Glimmer, tree people called the Twiggetts, and Madame Razz, the comically inept witch, who arrives on her talking Broom to reveal that the Horde are threatening to enslave the villagers unless the Rebels responsible for the fight in the inn give themselves up, and that some of the Horde's worst villains, including Catra, Mantenna, Leech and Scorpia are there, stacking the odds almost insurmountably against the rebels. Bow is willing to surrender to save the village, but Adam and Glimmer convince the group that they should fight back to save the villagers instead.

As the Horde, led by Force Captain Adora, start taking away the villagers, they are attacked by the Rebels, aided by Adam and Cringer in their secret identities as He-Man and Battle Cat. He-Man confronts Adora and the Sword of Protection glows in her presence, revealing that she is the one he's looking for. This distraction allows the Horde to knock He-Man out and capture him.

Madame Razz uses divination to discover that the Horde have taken He-Man to their prison complex on Beast Island, and the Rebels head there to attempt a rescue. In the prison, Adora interrogates He-Man and agrees that the sword seems to be meant for her, to which He-Man retorts that he is to give it to someone who serves good rather than evil. Adora believes the Rebels are evil and the Horde the rightful, benevolent rulers of Etheria, although she admits to not knowing much about life outside the Horde's base. When He-Man dares her to see for herself what life on Etheria is really like, Adora says she'll think about it. The Rebels arrive on Beast Island and manage to get into the prison to find He-Man, only to get captured and imprisoned themselves. Kowl manages to elude capture and frees He-Man, who then frees the others and destroys the prison. Meanwhile, Adora has ventured into the towns outside the Fright Zone and sees first-hand the cruelties Etheria's citizens are forced to endure at the hands of the Horde.

As Hordak and Shadow Weaver discuss how He-Man is a threat too powerful to ignore, they are confronted by Adora wielding the Sword of Protection. She has discovered how cruel the Horde truly are, but Shadow Weaver casts Adora into a mystic sleep that will make her forget what she learned and takes the sword, planning to learn its secrets.

Later, Hordak shows the Horde his latest weapon: the Magna-Beam, a willpower-fueled transporter that will allow him to send the entire Rebel base into exile forever. However, none of the Horde's captives have sufficient willpower to fully charge the machine. He-Man sneaks into the Horde base looking for Adora, but Adora once again thinks he's the villain and arrests him. Hordak then confines He-Man in the Magna-Beam's energy chamber to charge it overnight.

Later that night, Adora has nightmares about He-Man's fate and hears a voice calling her name. She discovers the Sorceress talking to her through the Sword of Protection and asking her to help He-Man, whom the Sorceress reveals is Adora's twin brother. After reflecting upon the Sorceress's words, Adora breaks Shadow Weaver's spell then follows the Sorceress's instructions to hold the sword aloft and say "For the Honour of Grayskull!" She then transforms into the superpowered She-Ra, Princess of Power. After she rescues and revives He-Man, the pair destroy the Magna-Beam and make their getaway on Adora's horse Spirit, who in She-Ra's presence is transformed into a talking winged unicorn named Swift Wind.

She-Ra reveals that she is He-Man's sister, but He-Man is skeptical. When She-Ra explains that she was told by the 'woman in the sword', He-Man uses the Sword of Protection to contact the Sorceress, who confirms and explains their relationship. When Adam and Adora were born to King Randor and Queen Marlena, Eternia was invaded by the Horde.  Unable to defeat the combined might of the Eternian army and the magic of Castle Grayskull, Hordak plotted to demoralize them by kidnapping the newborn royals, aided by his favorite pupil (and He-Man's future archenemy) Skeletor. Although the kidnapping was interrupted by Man-At-Arms, Hordak escaped with Adora and ultimately fled through a Time Gate. The Sorceress was unable to discover which dimension Hordak fled to, so she cast a spell that wiped all memory of Adora from the people of Eternia except for herself, Man-At-Arms, King Randor and Queen Marlena. Thus Adam was raised unaware of his sister's existence. Convinced by the Sorceress's story, He-Man happily accepts She-Ra as his sister.

Returning to the Rebel camp as Adam and Adora, the Rebellion accept Adora into their ranks after learning that she was mind-controlled into serving the Horde. The Rebels also discover that Queen Angella, rightful ruler of the kingdom of Bright Moon, is being held prisoner on nearby Talon Mountain, so Adam and Adora volunteer to rescue her. As He-Man and She-Ra, they defeat Queen Angella's jailer Hunga the Harpy, free Queen Angella, and reunite her with her people (including her daughter Glimmer).

Adam takes Adora back to Eternia to reunite with their parents, but Hordak has found out that Adora is with the Rebels and pursues them through the Time Gate. Finding himself back on Eternia, Hordak goes to his old base on Snake Mountain and discovers that Skeletor is now the principal villain of Eternia. Skeletor is not pleased to see his old mentor and engages him in a magical duel. Upon learning that Hordak is after Adora, Skeletor agrees to help him to be rid of him. Magically disguised as cooks and with Hordak hidden inside a giant cake, Skeletor and his henchmen manage to infiltrate the royal palace and kidnap Adora.

As Man-At-Arms, Teela and He-Man reassure the distraught king and queen that they will save Adora, Skeletor betrays Hordak and forces him back to Etheria, planning to ransom Adora himself. However, Adora manages to outwit her captors and, reclaiming her sword, deals with the villains as She-Ra before running into the rescue party. As He-Man introduces She-Ra to the others and helps her to convince them that Adora is safe, Skeletor is left bemoaning "A female He-Man! This is the worst day of my life!"

Adora decides to return to Etheria to aid the Rebellion, a decision accepted by her family, and the Sorceress sends Adora and Spirit back to Etheria, telling them they can use the Sword of Protection to summon aid from Eternia should they ever need it. Adam and Cringer tag along, offering to "help Adora get the Rebellion off to a big start".

As He-Man and She-Ra, the twins help the Rebels liberate Bright Moon, learning more about She-Ra's powers in the process (including using empathy to communicate with the wild animals of the Whispering Woods and healing Swift Wind when he is injured by the Horde). He-Man and Battle Cat then return to Eternia, while She-Ra and Swift Wind resolve to stay until all of Etheria is free.

Cast
 John Erwin as Prince Adam / He-Man, Beast Man, Webstor
 Melendy Britt as Princess Adora / She-Ra, Catra, Hunga the Harpy
 Alan Oppenheimer as Skeletor, Man-at-Arms, Cringer / Battle Cat, Bald Rebel, Chef Alan
 Linda Gary as Teela, Queen Marlena, Sorceress of Castle Grayskull, Shadow Weaver, Glimmer, Madame Razz, Scorpia
 George DiCenzo as Bow, Hordak
 Erika Scheimer as Queen Angella, Imp
 Lou Scheimer as King Randor, Swift Wind, Kowl, Mantenna, Horde Trooper, Kobra Khan, Leech, Trap Jaw, Tri-Klops, Broom, Sprag, Sprocker, Garv the Innkeeper, Bard, Messenger, Horde Computer (as Erik Gunden)

Comic book
A comic book, He-Man and She-Ra, Secret of the Sword, was published in 1985 by Mattel Toys as part of their "The Secret of the Sword Sweepstakes." The comic was handed out at theaters prior to seeing the film. The story runs six pages and recaps the film.

In the UK, a film novelisation was published by Ladybird Books.

Reception
No consensus among critics is currently available at Rotten Tomatoes. Janet Maslin of The New York Times and Charles Solomon of the Los Angeles Times likened the film to a Saturday morning children's cartoon extended to feature film length. Maslin in particular cited the film's plot as "complicated but entirely predictable". The film was, however, a box-office success, grossing more than three times its $2 million budget; according to IMDb and Lou Scheimer himself, the movie made over $7.5 million before finishing its theatrical run.

Kidtoon Films release
The film was picked up by Kidtoon Films as part of its weekend matinee program twenty-one years after its release. It returned to theaters on May 6, 2006 and closed on May 28, 2006, replaced the original Dolby Stereo soundtrack with Dolby Digital and DTS tracks, and even though it was shot on film, was shown digitally.

DVD release
The film was released on DVD in the United States on a two-disc set titled "The Best of She-Ra: Princess of Power" collection on July 18, 2006 by BCI Entertainment’s Ink & Paint brand, which also included five episodes from the series. The set was also released in the United Kingdom by Right Entertainment/Universal in September 2006.

The film was re-released as a stand-alone release in the United Kingdom on July 16, 2007., and in the United States on May 6, 2008.

The film was recently released on DVD as part of the He-Man and the Masters of the Universe: The Complete Series DVD from Universal Pictures Home Entertainment.

References

External links
 
 
 
  

1985 films
1985 animated films
1980s animated superhero films
American children's animated adventure films
American children's animated science fantasy films
American children's animated superhero films
Atlantic Entertainment Group films
1980s fantasy adventure films
Filmation animated films
Films based on television series
Masters of the Universe
Films based on Mattel toys
1980s American animated films
Animated crossover films
Films set on fictional planets
1980s science fiction adventure films
American fantasy adventure films
Films edited from television programs
Films scored by Shuki Levy
Films scored by Haim Saban
1980s children's animated films
1980s English-language films
Films directed by Gwen Wetzler
Films with screenplays by Larry DiTillio
Films with screenplays by Bob Forward
Films produced by Lou Scheimer